Stephen Teglatius (Theglatius, de Taleazis),, served as an Archbishop of Bar in the late 15th century. He is notable for contemporary treatises illuminating the continued commitment to the idea of the crusade and the issues with their organisation during this period.

Biography

There is little information of his early years but it is probable that he left the Republic of Venice for Rome following Cardinal Pietro Barbo or after the latters election as pope and lived in the city during the pontificates of Sixtus IV and Innocent VIII. His first recorded mention was his appointment as Archbishop of Bar, then under Ventian control, in November 1473 by Sixtus IV. He later held the title of Archbishop of Patras . In September 1485, Innocent VIII created him bishop of Torcello. From 1480, he was a member of the Curia as a pontifical orator despite frequently residing in Torcello and Venice. He was papal chaplain to Alexander VI from 1486, undertaking diplomatic duties in Venice on behalf of the pope concerning the recovery of stolen ecclesiastical property, the collection of rents or the conclusion of a papal agreement with the Venetians limiting Borgia ambitions on the Adriatic. Under Julius II he continued to live in Rome, in a house in Pigna where he kept a small collection of ancient manuscripts. In early 1509, he was allowed to return home before the pope joined the League of Cambrai. It is unclear what part he played during following war. In October 1509, he was briefly excommunicated for failing to pay 300 ducats to Valerio Dolce in opposition to the pope's orders. He returned to Rome to assist Julius II at the Fifth Council of the Lateran that opened in May 1512. In the autumn of the following year, the Cardinal Lorenzo Pucci commissioned a treatise on the reform of the Church. Further treatises were dedicated to the pope in support of the war against the Turks. In May 1515, he delivered another unsuccessful sermon against the Turks to open the tenth session of the Council. Returning to Venice, he died in the summer of the same year. In addition to the works mentioned, he also wrote a treatises on hypocrisy and ten books entitled  that do not survive.

It is believed that during his tenure as Archbishop of Antivari, he was the first that began carrying the title "totius serviae primas" (Primate of Serbia) - Philip Gaius, Teglatius' successor, is considered to be the first official Archbishop of Antivari carrying the title.

Episcopal succession
While bishop, he was the principal consecrator of:
Nicola di Gaeta, Archbishop of Naxos (1479);
Jan Strzelecki, Archbishop of Lviv (1481);
Donato de Georgiis, Bishop of Trebinje e Mrkan (1482);
Erasmus Perchinger, Auxiliary Bishop of Freising (1482);
Johann Spenner, Auxiliary Bishop of Köln (1482);
Johann von Eindhoven, Auxiliary Bishop of Trier (1483); and
Francesco de Noya, Bishop of Cefalù (1485);

and the principal co-consecrator of:
John O'Hedian, Bishop of Ossory (1479); and
Johann Schlecht, Auxiliary Bishop of Regensburg (1481).

References

Bibliography

 
 (for Chronology of Bishops) 
 (for Chronology of Bishops) 

Archbishops of Antivari
15th-century Roman Catholic archbishops in the Republic of Venice
1445 births
1515 deaths